This is a list of airports in Bulgaria. It is a partial list of public active aerodromes (airports and airfields), grouped by type and sorted by location.

The Republic of Bulgaria is a country in the Balkans in southeastern Europe. It borders five other countries: Romania to the north (mostly along the River Danube), Serbia and North Macedonia to the west, and Greece and Turkey to the south. The Black Sea defines the extent of the country to the east. The country's capital city is Sofia. Bulgaria is divided into 28 provinces which are subdivided into 265 municipalities.

Passenger statistics 
Bulgarian airports with number of passengers served:

Airports 

Airport names shown in bold indicate the airport has scheduled service on commercial airlines.

See also 
 Bulgarian Air Force
 Transport in Bulgaria
 List of Bulgarian Air Force Bases
 List of airlines of Bulgaria
 List of airports by ICAO code: L#LB – Bulgaria
 Wikipedia:WikiProject Aviation/Airline destination lists: Europe#Bulgaria

References 
 
 
 
  – includes IATA codes
  – ICAO codes
  – IATA and ICAO codes
 and Herzegovina Airport records for Bosnia and Herzegovina at Landings.com. Retrieved 2013-09-03

Footnotes 

 
Bulgaria
Airports
Airports
Bulgaria